Juan Helio Guamán (born 27 June 1965) is a retired Ecuadorian football defender.

International career
He obtained a total number of ten caps for the Ecuador national team during the early 1990s. He competed for his native country in two Copa America's: 1991 and 1995.

References

External links

1965 births
Living people
Footballers from Quito
Ecuadorian footballers
Association football defenders
Ecuador international footballers
L.D.U. Quito footballers
S.D. Quito footballers
C.D. ESPOLI footballers
C.D. Universidad Católica del Ecuador footballers
1991 Copa América players
1995 Copa América players